Jagatbela railway station is a railway station on Lucknow–Gorakhpur line under the Lucknow NER railway division of North Eastern Railway zone. This is situated beside Gorakhpur-Jagatbela Road at Jagatbela in Gorakhpur district in the Indian state of Uttar Pradesh.

References

Railway stations in Gorakhpur district
Lucknow NER railway division